The Temple of Ares was a sanctuary dedicated to Ares, located in the northern part of the Ancient Agora of Athens. The Temple was identified as such by Pausanias but the ruins present today indicate a complex history. Ares had a temple somewhat like Athena's.

The foundations are of early Greece construction and date, but fragments of the superstructure, now located at the western end of the temple, can be dated to the 5th century BC. From the fragments archaeologists are confident that they belonged to a Doric peripteral temple of a similar size, plan and date to the Temple of Hephaestus. Marks on the remaining stones indicate that the temple may have originally stood elsewhere and was dismantled, moved and reconstructed on the Roman base - a practice common during the Roman occupation of Greece. The temple probably came from the sanctuary of Athena Pallenis at modern Stavro, where foundations have been found but no temple remains are present.

Pausanias described the sanctuary in the 1st century: 
[At Athens] is a sanctuary of Ares, where are placed two images of Aphrodite, one of Ares made by Alkamenes, and one of Athena made by a Parian of the name of Lokros. There is also an image of Enyo, made by the sons of Praxiteles. About the temple stand images of Herakles, Theseus, Apollo binding his hair with a fillet, and statues of Kalades, who it is said framed laws for the Athenians, and of Pindaros, the statue being one of the rewards the Athenians gave him for praising them in an ode.

However, as the Roman Empire had adopted Christianity as the official religion of the empire, in the late third and early fourth centuries, probably under the 
Persecution of pagans in the late Roman Empire by Emperor Theodosius I, the temple of Ares was destroyed and looted.

References

Camp II, John McK. (2003) The Athenian Agora: A Short Guide to the Excavations. The American School of Classical Studies at Athens. .

Ares
Temples of Ares
5th-century BC religious buildings and structures
Ancient Agora of Athens